Takako Fujita (藤田 多佳子, Fujita Takako) is a paralympic swimmer from Japan competing mainly in category S5 events.

Takako was part of the highly successful Japanese 4x50m freestyle at both the 2000 and 2004 Summer Paralympics that not only won gold medals but also on both occasions broke the world record.  At the 2004 games she also swam in the 50m freestyle finishing last in her heat, finished eighth in the 100m and 200m  freestyle finals. At the 2004 games she also won a bronze in the 4x50m medley finished last in her heat of the 50m, 100m and 200m freestyle and 50m breaststroke.

References

External links
 

Year of birth missing (living people)
Living people
Japanese female breaststroke swimmers
Japanese female freestyle swimmers
Paralympic swimmers of Japan
Paralympic gold medalists for Japan
Paralympic bronze medalists for Japan
Paralympic medalists in swimming
Swimmers at the 2000 Summer Paralympics
Swimmers at the 2004 Summer Paralympics
Medalists at the 2000 Summer Paralympics
Medalists at the 2004 Summer Paralympics
S5-classified Paralympic swimmers
21st-century Japanese women